Serenella Sbrissa (born 13 July 1977) is a former Italian female middle and long-distance runner who competed at one edition of the IAAF World Cross Country Championships at senior level (1998).

Biography
She won 8 national championships at senior level.

National titles
Italian Athletics Championships
800 m: 1994, 1996
1500 m: 1994, 1996, 1997, 1998
Italian Athletics Indoor Championships
1500 m: 1997
3000 m: 1997

References

External links
 

1977 births
Living people
Italian female middle-distance runners
Italian female long-distance runners
Athletics competitors of Fiamme Oro